Amir Ohana (born 15 March 1976) is an Israeli lawyer, former Shin Bet official and politician who has served as the Speaker of the Knesset since 2022, and as a member of the Knesset for Likud. He previously held the posts of Minister of Justice and Minister of Public Security. He was the first openly gay right-wing member of the Knesset and the first openly gay man from Likud to serve in the Knesset. He is also the first openly gay person to be appointed as a minister in the Israeli government and the first openly gay Speaker of the Knesset.

Early life
Ohana was born in Beersheba, the third son of Meir and Esther Ohana, immigrants from Morocco. In his youth his family moved to Lehavim and then to Rishon LeZion. He served in the Israel Defense Forces as a road accident investigator in the Military Police. He served as part of a force securing traffic arteries in the Gaza Strip and as a road accident investigator in southern Israel, completed an officer's course and was a commander of the Karni crossing. He also commanded a military police base. Ohana served a total of six years of regular service in the IDF,
and is still a reservist. After leaving regular military service he served in Shin Bet for another six years.

Ohana studied law at the College of Management Academic Studies and, after earning an LLB, interned with the Israeli Justice Ministry in the State Prosecutor's Office. He then worked as a lawyer in criminal law for a decade.

Political career

The chairman of the Likud gay caucus Likud Pride, Ohana gained 32nd slot on the Likud list for the 2015 Knesset elections in the party primaries, a place reserved for a member from Tel Aviv District. Although he failed to gain a seat when the party won 30 seats, he moved to 31st spot after minister and MK Danny Danon resigned from the Knesset to assume position of Israel's envoy to the UN. Ohana eventually entered the Knesset on 27 December 2015 as a replacement for Silvan Shalom after he resigned amidst a sexual harassment scandal. During his first term in the Knesset he served as a member of the Finance Committee and the Foreign Affairs and Defense Committee, as well chairing the Lobby for Shaping the Gun-Carrying Policy in Israel and joining the Lobby for Medical Cannabis. He also became co-chair the Israel–Japan Parliamentary Friendship Group.

After being re-elected in the April 2019 elections he was appointed Minister of Justice in June, becoming the first openly LGBT individual to serve in the government. His appointment came after controversial comments from Bezalel Smotrich, another contender for the office, saying that he would like to establish a halachic state governed by Jewish religious law. Ohana was considered a Netanyahu loyalist and supported exempting the prime minister from prosecution in the Netanyahu corruption investigations. He was re-elected in September 2019 and March 2020. In May 2020 he was appointed Minister of Public Security in the new government. In that role, he deprioritized Palestinian prisoners in Israel's COVID-19 vaccination priority list.

In July 2020 he resigned from the Knesset under the Norwegian Law and was replaced by Amit Halevi.

For the 2021 elections, Ohana was placed eighteenth on Likud's list, and returned to the Knesset as Likud won 30 seats. He left the cabinet after a new government was formed, with Likud going into opposition.

On 22 November 2022 it was reported that Prime Minister-designate Benjamin Netanyahu was considering appointing Ohana as Foreign Minister of Israel in Netanyahu's incoming government. Ohana was ultimately elected Speaker of the Knesset on 29 December, becoming the first LGBT Speaker in Israeli history. After his election, he became the target of homophobic verbal attacks from some rabbis and Haredi MKs.

Views and opinions
Ohana is a supporter of loosening the policy on carrying firearms in Israel in order to allow more armed people on streets for prevention and fast reaction to terror attacks. After entering the Knesset, Ohana inaugurated the caucus to lobby and promote this cause.

When opposition members of Knesset in February 2016 proposed several bills intended to improve the gay community's status such as recognizing bereaved widowers, banning conversion therapy, recognizing same-sex marriage contracts and to train health professionals to deal with gender and sexual orientation issues, Ohana left the session without voting; he said he could not vote against these bills, but he did not want to violate the party line.

Ohana has given media interviews in which he described Muslims as likely to have "cultural muderousness".

He is a board member of Tadmor – Eretz Yisrael loyalists group within Likud.

Personal life
Ohana and his husband Alon Hadad, have a son and a daughter together. Their children were born with a surrogate mother in the US state of Oregon. They live in Tel Aviv.

References

External links

1976 births
Living people
20th-century Israeli military personnel
21st-century Israeli lawyers
College of Management Academic Studies alumni
Israeli Jews
Israeli officers
Israeli people of Moroccan-Jewish descent
Gay politicians
Gay Jews
Jewish human rights activists
Jewish Israeli politicians
Jewish military personnel
LGBT conservatism
LGBT members of the Knesset
Israeli LGBT rights activists
Likud politicians
Members of the 20th Knesset (2015–2019)
Members of the 21st Knesset (2019)
Members of the 22nd Knesset (2019–2020)
Members of the 23rd Knesset (2020–2021)
Members of the 24th Knesset (2021–2022)
Members of the 25th Knesset (2022–)
Ministers of Justice of Israel
Ministers of Public Security of Israel
People from Rishon LeZion
People of the Shin Bet
Politicians from Beersheba
21st-century LGBT people
Lawyers from Beersheba